MEWA Textil-Service is a business group in the Textile Service sector (textile rental) with 43 locations in Germany and other European countries. The head office is based in Wiesbaden.

The company has the naming rights for the Mewa Arena, a multi-use stadium in Mainz, Germany.

External links 
 Mewa Textil-Service AG & Co.

Textile companies of Germany
Companies based in Wiesbaden